The Shoushan Zoo is a zoo in Gushan District, Kaohsiung, Taiwan. It is located on the northern border of Shoushan Park and houses animals from Asia, Africa, Americas and Australia, such as lions, tigers, elephants, black bears and kangaroos.

History
It was founded in 1978 but moved to its present location in 1986. The zoo belongs to the Scenic Area Administration of Kaohsiung City now.

A number of incidents in 2007 brought to light varying issues the zoo had accumulated over the years. From reports of zoo staff not knowing the species and sex of its animals to veterinarians losing limbs to a crocodile, further investigation drew forth acknowledgement of the zoo's lack of funding and manpower. Visiting experts and directors have described it as the worst government-run zoo in Taiwan in consideration of terrible conditions their animals are kept in. Since then however, the zoo has undergone a considerable renovation project in 2009 costing NT$150 million. Whether or not this was related to the then unconfirmed plan to import two white tigers is debatable, but the zoo reopened on July 12 in the same year after 5 months of reconstruction and as of 26 May 2011 does indeed now have the aforementioned animals.

Architecture

Exhibitions

See also
 List of tourist attractions in Taiwan

References

1978 establishments in Taiwan
Buildings and structures in Kaohsiung
Gushan District
Tourist attractions in Kaohsiung
Zoos established in 1978
Zoos in Taiwan